Dieleghem Abbey or Dielegem Abbey is a former abbey located in the Brussels municipality of Jette, Belgium.

History

The oldest reference to the abbey dates from 1095, when the Bishop of Cambrai issued a charter in its favour. Initially administered by Augustinian canons, in 1140, the abbey's monks switched to the rules of the Premonstratensian order. In the 13th century, the abbey now called Dieleghem possessed half of the municipality's territory and played an important social and economic role until the French Revolution. The abbots, mitred from 1532, sat in the States of Brabant; the representation of the three estates (nobility, clergy and commoners) to the court of the Duke of Brabant.

In November 1796, the canons regular were evicted and deported to an island off the shores of Brittany, France. Dieleghem Abbey was looted and subsequently destroyed, sparing only the abbot's residence. Other abbeys in Flanders, like Afflighem, Grimbergen and Groot-Bijgaarden, shared a similar fate.

The abbot's former residence now houses the collections of the museum of the County of Jette.

References

Notes

Further reading
 G. Paulus, De abdij van Dielegem, in the series Brussel, stad van kunst en geschiendenis, 41 (Brussels, 2005), 48p. 
 G. Paulus, L’abbaye de Dieleghem, in the series Bruxelles, ville d’art et d’histoire (Brussels, 2005), 48 p.
 G. Paulus, Jette, in the series Guides des communes de la Région bruxelloise (Brussels, 2000), 83 p.

External links

 County of Jette Communal Museum, brusselsmuseums.be
 De abdij van Dielegem, erfgoed.brussels
 Abdij van Dielegem, irisnet.be

Christian monasteries in Brussels
1095 establishments in Europe
Premonstratensian monasteries in Belgium
Jette